Ashtavakra or Ushtaavukruhu is a revered Vedic sage in Hinduism. His name literally means "eight deformities", reflecting the eight physical deformities he was born with. His maternal grandfather was the Vedic sage Aruni, his parents were both Vedic students at Aruni's school. Ashtavakra studied, became a sage and a celebrated character of the Hindu Itihasa epics and Puranas.

Ashtavakra is the author of the text Aṣṭāvakra Gītā, also known as Aṣṭāvakra Saṃhitā, in Hindu traditions. The text is a treatise on Brahman and Atman.

History
Little is known about the life or century in which Ashtavakra actually lived, except for the accounts found in the major Indian Epics (the Ramayana and the Mahabharata) and the Puranas. The legends state that sage Aruni, mentioned in the Chāndogya Upaniṣad, ran a school (Āśrama) teaching the Vedas. Kahoḍa was one of his students, along with Aruni's daughter Sujata. Aruni's daughter married Kahoḍa. She got pregnant, and during her pregnancy, the developing baby heard the chanting of the Vedas and learnt the correct recitation. According to one version of the legends surrounding Ashtavakra, his father was once reciting the Vedas, but erred in correct intonation. The fetus spoke from the womb and told his father about the limited knowledge he was aware of from the Vedic books, there is much more to know apart from these books. The father got angry and cursed him to be born with eight deformities, hence the name 'Ashtavakra'.

His father, Kahoda, once went to ask for riches, to Janaka, the ancient king of Videha, for his family was poor. He was, there, defeated in debates of science by Vandin, and in consequence was drowned in water. Hearing of the drowning of her husband, she kept it secret from her child. When Ashtavakra grew up, he learned everything about his curse and his father. Then he asked his mother to come with him to witness the great sacrifice of king Janaka. He was stopped from entering the king's sacrifice as only learned Brahamanas and Kings were allowed to enter, and he was just in his tenth year. With the proficiency of speaking, he had the king amazed with the knowledge he possessed; so, he was allowed to enter. There, he challenged the Vandin for controversy. After a heated debate, he defeated Vandin in knowledge by words. And asked the king, as Vandin used to cast Brahmanas into the water, let him meet with the same fate. Vandin then revealed that he is the son of Varun, and explained that the reason he drowned those Brahmins was a ritual that his father is performing from twelve years and needed a large number of Brahmins. By then, the ritual was done and thus all the Brahmins he drowned, including Ashtavakra's father Kahoda, were freed. Kahoda was very impressed with his son, Ashtavakra, and while going back home, asked him to take a dip in the river 'Samanga'. As Ashtavakra came out of the river, it was seen all of his deformities had been cured.

Attributed texts

Aṣṭāvakra is credited as the author of the Ashtavakra Gita (IAST: Aṣṭāvakra Gītā), which means "song of Ashtavakra". The text is also known as Aṣṭāvakra Saṃhitā. The Ashtavakra Gita examines the metaphysical nature of existence and the meaning of individual freedom, presenting its thesis that there is only one Supreme Reality (Brahman), the entirety of universe is oneness and manifestation of this reality, everything is interconnected, all Self (Atman, soul) are part of that one, and that individual freedom is not the end point but a given, a starting point, innate.

According to Jessica Wilson, the Sanskrit poetics in Ashtavakra Gita is not driven by critical syllogism, but it is rich in philosophical premises, spiritual effectiveness and its resonant narrative because of "textual indeterminacy between the audience's disposition and the foregrounded theme of non-individuation in the text. This tension . . . results in consistency building by the audience, which enables the transcendence of these two viewpoints (reader and text)".

According to Radhakamal Mukerjee, the Ashtavakra Gita was likely composed after the Bhagavad Gita but before the start of the common era, and attributed to sage Ashtavakra out of reverence for his ideas.

Itihāsa

Ramayana
Aṣṭāvakra is referenced in verse 6.119.17 of Yuddha Kāṇḍa in Vālmikī's Rāmāyaṇa. When Daśaratha comes to see Rāma from heaven after the war of the Rāmāyaṇa, he tells Rāma –

In the Aranya Kanda of Adhyatma Ramayana, the demon Kabandha narrates his story to Rama and Lakshmana, in which he says that he was a Gandharva earlier who was cursed by Ashtavakra to become a demon when he laughed on seeing him (Ashtavakra). When the Gandharva then bowed down to Ashtavakra, Ashtavakra said that he would be released from the curse by Rama in Treta Yuga.

Mahābhārata

In the Vana Parva of the Mahābhārata, the legend of Aṣṭāvakra is described in greater detail. On losing the game of dice with the Kauravas, the five Pāṇḍava princes and Draupadi are exiled for twelve years. On their pilgrimage, they meet the sage Lomaśa, and he narrates to the Pāṇḍava princes the legend of Aṣṭāvakra, over three chapters of Vana Parva of the Mahābhārata. Aṣṭāvakra's wisdom on various aspects of human existence is recited in the Mahābhārata. For example:

Puranas
Aṣṭāvakra and Śvetaketu made his way to Janaka's palace. Aṣṭāvakra first faced the gatekeeper who tried to keep the young boy out. On convincing the gatekeeper that he was well versed in the scriptures and hence old, he was let in. Then Janaka tested Aṣṭāvakra with cryptic questions which Aṣṭāvakra answered with ease. Janaka decided to let Aṣṭāvakra face Vandin. Vandin and Aṣṭāvakra began the debate, with Vandin starting. They alternately composed six extempore verses on the numbers one to twelve. Then Vandin could only compose the first half of a verse on the number thirteen. Aṣṭāvakra completed the verse by composing the second half and thus won the argument against Vandin. This unique debate is full of enigmas and latent meanings which lie under the simple counts of the numbers one to thirteen.

In arts
 Aṣṭāvakra is one of the characters in the First Act of the Sanskrit play Uttara-Rāmacaritam composed by Bhavabhuti in the 8th century.
 The 571st volume of the Amar Chitra Katha, first published in 1976, is titled Dhruva and Ashtavakra. The second half of the volume presents the narrative of Ashtavakra. 
 A puppet play on Ashtavakra was staged by the Dhaatu Artist group in Ranga Shankara in Bangalore in 2010.
 Ashtavakra Gita became very popular after Indian Spiritual leader Sri Sri Ravi Shankar gave a commentary in Bangalore in 1991.

See also
Agastya
Ashtavakra Gita
Ancient Mithila University

Notes

External links
Ashtavakra Gita English Audio Book
Ashtavakra Gita Hindi Audio Book
Ashtavakra Gita Marathi Audio Book
 Aṣṭāvakra Story in the Mahābhārata
 Aṣṭāvakra (u will find in middle of text)

Rishishttp://oshosearch.net/Convert/Articles_Osho/The_Mahageeta_Volume_1/Osho-The-Mahageeta-Volume-1-00000004.html
Hindu poetry
Sanskrit literature
Hindu philosophers and theologians
 Ancient Indian philosophers
 Ancient Indian poets